Ioan Valeriu Achiriloaie (born August 20, 1990 in Braşov, Romania) is an alpine skier from Romania. He competed for Romania at the 2014 Winter Olympics in the alpine skiing events.

References

1990 births
Living people
Olympic alpine skiers of Romania
Alpine skiers at the 2014 Winter Olympics
Romanian male alpine skiers
Sportspeople from Brașov